The 1940–41 Scottish Districts season is a record of all the rugby union matches for Scotland's district teams.

History

There was no Inter-City match this year due to the Second World War.

East of Scotland District played a West of Scotland District side.

Results

Inter-City

None.

Other Scottish matches

East of Scotland District:

West of Scotland District:

English matches

No other District matches played.

International matches

No touring matches this season.

References

1940–41 in Scottish rugby union
Scottish Districts seasons